Sashi may refer to:

Fiction 
 Sashi (film), a 2021 Telugu-language film
Sashi Kobayashi, a character in the American animated TV series Penn Zero: Part-Time Hero

People with the given name 

Sashi Brown (born 1976), American attorney and football executive
Sashi Kiran, Fijian founder and director of non-profit community organisation
 Sashi Kumar, Indian media personality, film director and journalist
 Sashi Menon (born 1952), Indian retired tennis player
 Sashi Rawal, Nepali pop singer

Indian masculine given names